Scopula supernivearia is a moth of the family Geometridae. It was described by Inouein 1963. It is found in Japan and on the Kuriles.

References

Moths described in 1963
supernivearia
Moths of Japan
Moths of Asia
Taxa named by Hiroshi Inoue